Covers (also known as Covers, Vol. 1) is the twelfth studio album by Filipino singer Regine Velasquez, released in the Philippines on October 20, 2004, by Viva Records. It is a cover album that consists of love songs, originally recorded by male OPM acts from the 80's and 90's. It turned Platinum three days after its official release.

The album was released on digital download through iTunes on August 1, 2004, with a slightly different cover. To date, the album has sold over 160,000 copies in the country, certified Quadruple Platinum by the Philippine Association of the Record Industry.

Background
Early in 2004, Velasquez has not yet released any studio album since Reigne (2001), which was released four years before. She has only released a few soundtracks from her hit movies and compilations of her past songs. This was the reason Viva Recording Management decided for Velasquez to record another full studio album. Like R2K (2000), her last all-remake album, Covers consists of revivals hence the title of the album.

Concept
Covers, from the title itself, is a revival album. The idea of doing renditions of all-male OPM classics came up from Velasquez herself. According to her, it is a compilation of most of her favorite OPM songs rendered by mostly male artists. On an interview, she said This is my way of introducing the young set of listeners to the beauty of OPM past. She said that she decided to come out with another revival album because "these songs are really beautiful and it will be a good idea to re-introduce them to the younger crowd". She further stated that she did not have a love life during that time, that is why the concept of the album is songs by male singers.

Production and recording
Velasquez considers Covers as the most expensive album she has ever made, due to the fact that the original composers of the songs secure the rights of their materials, that her record company had to pull some strings just get their permission. She explained "On my part, I wouldn't have persisted on getting the songs if I felt I wouldn't be able to add something new to these. I'm not the type who'd remake something that's already perfect the first time around". Although, she just mentioned updating the arrangement and not revising too much of the materials, out of respect for the works.

She stated "I gave VIVA a list of my favorite songs and let them take care of it. Some songs in the list had to go for two reasons—one is because VIVA can't get the rights for the song, and two, because the original version is much too beautiful already to be altered". Each of the album's tracks was recorded for no more than forty-five minutes. Velasquez stated that if the time reaches above that limit, she begins to go deaf. She also admitted that as her study, she recorded the instrumental versions of all the tracks on a cassette tape, and played it in her car over and over again to know how she will perform the back-up vocals.

Songs
"Minsan Lang Kitang Iibigin" has personal resonance to both Velasquez and her former boyfriend Ariel Rivera, but she explains "that's not the reason why I chose the song". She stated that since the first she heard the song (from Rivera's album Simple Lang), it became her favorite. She also considers the album to be Rivera's best so far. However, she did not have to get his permission to allow her to revive the song, saying "I didn't have to because it wasn't Ariel who wrote the song. I did mention it to him casually during one taping for Forever in My Heart and he just said, 'That's nice'". "Say That You Love Me" has a significance in Velasquez's life. She expressed falling in love with the song, when Louie Ocampo re-arranged it during her tenth anniversary concert held at University of the Philippines Diliman. "Di Bale Na Lang" marks the first time in her career that she has done some rap verses. She was mentored by Filipino rapper-composer Andrew E., saying "it was fun doing the song, fun working with Andrew. He wrote the verses when he was in the studio na lang. Such an intelligent guy...". "Pangarap Ko'y Ikaw" is the only original song in the album. It was originally written for a male singer, but when Velasquez heard the song and got interested to it, she asked the composers, Raul Mitra and her sister Cacai, to lend it to her. The song "Dadalhin" originally included in her album Reigne, was re-recorded in an acoustic version and was put in the album as a hidden track.

Track listing

Notes:
 "Pangarap Ko'y Ikaw" and "Dadalhin" are original songs.
 The standard edition of the album includes a bonus VCD containing:
 "Minsan Lang Kitang Iibigin" (music video)
 "Forevermore" (Theme from "Forever In My Heart") (music video)
 "Say That You Love Me" (music video)
 "Pangarap Ko'y Ikaw" (music video)

Personnel
 Andrew E. - vocals
 Alwyn B. Cruz - supervising producer
 Jun de Leon - photography
 Vic del Rosario, Jr. - executive producer
 Vicente del Rosario - executive producer
 Mike Duran - production assistant
 Jay Durias - vocals
 Baby Gil - supervising producer
 Medwin Marfil - vocals
 Sam S. Samson - album cover and lay-out design
 Dianne Velasquez-Roque - production assistant
 Regine Velasquez - album producer, vocals

Certifications

Release history

References

2004 albums
Regine Velasquez albums
Covers albums